Sergey Vasilyevich Vasilyev (19 September 1827 in Moscow, Imperial Russia – 17 June 1862 in Moscow, Imperial Russia) was a prominent Russian stage actor, a mid-19th century star of the Moscow Maly Theatre.

Career 
Originally a comic actor, in 1844–1853 Vasilyev played 150 vaudevillian parts at the Maly. "Vasilyev's [was] Russian theatre's not just the best but the only true Khlestakov," Prov Sadovsky argued. In the 1850s he became more involved in serious Russian drama, and Alexander Ostrovsky once remarked that it was in Vasilyev that "he'd found 'a perfect performer, one of those actors whom drama authors so eagerly look for and so rarely meet'." On 16 November 1859, Ostrovsky's best-known play The Storm was premiered at Maly, as a benefit for Vasilyev (who played Tikhon on this particular occasion).

References 

Russian stage actors
Male actors from Moscow
1827 births
1862 deaths